The Ford MA Concept concept car was a 2002 minimalist design exercise drawn by Jose Paris and championed by Ford's VP of design J. Mays. It  was exhibited as an art object in museums as well as a traditional concept car in auto shows. It received an IDSA Silver Industrial Design Excellence Award in 2003.

The MA displayed many unusual automotive practices.  It had the shape of a low slung two seat roadster with no top, but it was powered by an electric motor.  The design was flexible enough, though, to accommodate a small internal combustion engine.

Very few of the parts were painted and there were none of the usual hydraulic fluids or industrial adhesives common in most cars, making it 96% recyclable.

It was designed to be assembled and disassembled easily with a minimal amount of equipment.  There were no welds holding it together:  Instead, its 500 or so pieces of bamboo, aluminum and carbon fibre were held together with 364 titanium bolts.  The total weight was said to be .

Some automotive columnists have presented the Ford MA as the forerunner to a small series kit car, much like the Lotus Seven. Others have called it an IKEA-mobile.

External links 
 Coverage at ConceptCar.co.uk
 Article in Motor Trend 

MA